Tawhid Mosque is a contemporary mosque in Aleppo, Syria, located on Khalil al-Hindawi street, on the right bank of the Queiq River. It was opened in 1981 and features a combined style of the early Islamic Abbasid architecture and modern mosques.

It has a large central dome surrounded with 4 smaller domes and 4 circular minarets. It is surrounded with two churches and a small park.

The mosque is notable for being built in a largely Christian-populated district of Aleppo.

References

Architecture in Syria
Mosques in Aleppo
20th-century mosques
Mosques completed in 1981